The 1968 All-East football team consists of American football players chosen by various selectors as the best players at each position among the Eastern colleges and universities during the 1968 NCAA University Division football season.

The undefeated 1968 Penn State Nittany Lions football team was ranked No. 2 in the final AP Poll and placed five players on the All-Eastern first team.

Four players were unanimous choices by the Associated Press: end Ted Kwalick and linebacker Dennis Onkotz of Penn State; and fullback Charley Jarvis and linebacker Ken Johnson of Army.

Offense

Quarterback
 Brian Dowling, Yale (AP-1)

Halfbacks
 Charlie Pittman, Penn State (AP-1)
 Calvin Hill, Yale (AP-1)

Fullback
 Charley Jarvis, Army  (AP-1)

Ends
 Ted Kwalick, Penn State (AP-1)
 Bob Neary, Holy Cross (AP-1)

Tackles
 Kyle Gee, Yale (AP-1)
 Bob Bouley, Boston College (AP-1)

Guards
 Tom Jones, Harvard (AP-1)
 Dave Zimmerman, Rutgers (AP-1)

Center
 Fred Morris, Yale (AP-1)

Defense

Ends
 Lou Gubitosa, Syracuse (AP-1)
 John Cramer, Harvard (AP-1)

Tackles
 Mike Reid, Penn State (AP-1)
 Steve Smear, Penn State (AP-1)
 Art Thoms, Syracuse (AP-1)

Linebackers
 Dennis Onkotz, Penn State (AP-1)
 Ken Johnson, Army (AP-1)
 John Emery, Harvard (AP-1)

Backs  
 Tony Kyasky, Syracuse (AP-1)
 Jim McCall, Army (AP-1)
 Pat Conway, Harvard (AP-1)

Key
 AP = Associated Press
 UPI = United Press International

See also
 1968 College Football All-America Team

References

All-Eastern
All-Eastern college football teams